The Battle of Mariazell or Battle of Grossraming (8 November 1805) saw the advance guard of the French III Corps attack a retreating Austrian force led by Maximilian, Count of Merveldt. The action occurred during the War of the Third Coalition, which is part of the Napoleonic Wars.

Battle
The advance guard, led by Étienne Heudelet de Bierre overwhelmed their demoralized enemies, capturing about half of them. Marshal Louis Davout commanded the III Corps.

The 1805 war began with the Ulm Campaign which was disastrous for Austria, with only the corps of Michael von Kienmayer and Franz Jellacic escaping envelopment by the Grande Armée of Napoleon. As Kienmayer's columns fled to the east, they joined with elements of the Russian Empire's army in a rear guard action at the Battle of Amstetten on 5 November. A few days later, Davout's III Corps caught up with Merveldt's division at Mariazell. The Austrian soldiers, their morale shaken by continuous retreating, were routed after a brief struggle.

Aftermath
On 12 November, Austria's capital Vienna fell to the French without a fight. The outcome of the war would be decided by the Battle of Austerlitz in early December.

References

External links
 

Battles involving France
Battles involving Austria
Battles of the Napoleonic Wars
Battles of the War of the Third Coalition
Conflicts in 1805
1805 in the Austrian Empire
November 1805 events